The Ghana Redevelopment Party is a political party in Ghana.
It is one of thirty-six parties formed since the end of military rule in 1992. It has been inactive and did not contest the 2020 Ghanaian general election.

See also
List of political parties in Ghana

References

Political parties in Ghana
2008 establishments in Ghana
Political parties established in 2008